is a passenger railway station located in Midori-ku, Yokohama, Kanagawa Prefecture, Japan, operated by the East Japan Railway Company (JR East).

Lines
Many services continue west of Higashi-Kanagawa via the Negishi Line to  during the offpeak, and to  during the morning peak.

Station layout 
The station consists of a single island platform serving two elevated tracks with the station building underneath. The station has a Midori no Madoguchi staffed ticket office.

Platforms

History 
Kamoi Station was opened on 25 December 1962 as a  station on the Japanese National Railways (JNR). With the privatization of the JNR on 1 April 1987, the station came under the operational control of JR East. A new station building was completed in 1998.

Station numbering was introduced on 20 August 2016 with Kamoi being assigned station number JH18.

Passenger statistics
In fiscal 2019, the station was used by an average of 39,588 passengers daily (boarding passengers only).

The passenger figures (boarding passengers only) for previous years are as shown below.

Surrounding area
Yokohama City Kamoi Elementary School
Yokohama City Kamoi Junior High School
Yokohama City Higashikamoi Junior High School
 Kanagawa Prefectural Hakusan High School

See also
 List of railway stations in Japan

References

External links

 

Railway stations in Kanagawa Prefecture
Railway stations in Japan opened in 1962
Railway stations in Yokohama
Stations of East Japan Railway Company
Yokohama Line